The Virtual Library of Musicology or ViFaMusik was funded by the German Research Foundation (Deutsche Forschungsgemeinschaft) to provide sources and materials for music and musicology. The project was active from July 2005 to March 2020 at the Bavarian State Library, in cooperation with the State Institute for Musicological Research in Berlin and the German Musicological Society.

Description 
ViFaMusik, the central portal for music and musicology, offered access to an extensive digital library containing scholarly research and online resources such as bibliographical data, entries to experts and research projects as well as current events on search topics.  The available material included items from the inventory of the Bavarian State Library and sources and databases from other institutions.

See also 
 Handel Reference Database
 International Musicological Society

References

External links 
 Official archives by the Bavarian State Library
 Virtual Library of Musicology (archived)

Musicology
Music databases
Databases in Germany
Internet properties established in 2005